Werner Otto Leuenberger (W.O.L.) (Bern, Switzerland, 21 December 1932 – Bern, Switzerland, 11 April 2009) was a Swiss painter, illustrator, graphic artist and sculptor. He lived and worked in Bern.

He is famous for his quote: "Ich nehme alles auf, ich eliminiere nichts, all das geht unter die Haut – und dann muss ich es malen" (I absorb all, I eliminate nothing, everything goes under my skin – and then I have to paint)

Books
AA.VV., W.O.L.  – Werner Otto Leuenberger, Benteli Verlag, Bern

External links

1932 births
20th-century Swiss painters
Swiss male painters
21st-century Swiss painters
21st-century Swiss male artists
2009 deaths
20th-century Swiss male artists